In geometric group theory and dynamical systems the iterated monodromy group of a covering map is a group describing the monodromy action of the fundamental group on all iterations of the covering. A single covering map between spaces is therefore used to create a tower of coverings, by placing the covering over itself repeatedly. In terms of the Galois theory of covering spaces, this construction on spaces is expected to correspond to a construction on groups. The iterated monodromy group provides this construction, and it is applied to encode the combinatorics and symbolic dynamics of the covering, and provide examples of self-similar groups.

Definition

The iterated monodromy group of f is the following quotient group:

where :

 is a covering of a path-connected and locally path-connected topological space X by its subset , 
  is the fundamental group of X and
  is the monodromy action for f.
  is the monodromy action of the  iteration of f, .

Action
The iterated monodromy group acts by automorphism on the rooted tree of preimages

Examples

Iterated monodromy groups of rational functions
Let :
 f be a complex rational function 
  be the union of forward orbits of its critical points (the post-critical set).

If  is finite (or has a finite set of accumulation points), then the iterated monodromy group of f is the iterated monodromy group of the covering , where  is the Riemann sphere.

Iterated monodromy groups of rational functions usually have exotic properties from the point of view of classical group theory. Most of them are infinitely presented, many have intermediate growth.

IMG of polynomials

The Basilica group is the iterated monodromy group of the polynomial

See also
 Growth rate (group theory)
 Amenable group
 Complex dynamics
 Julia set

References
 Volodymyr Nekrashevych, Self-Similar Groups, Mathematical Surveys and Monographs Vol. 117, Amer. Math. Soc., Providence, RI, 2005; .
 Kevin M. Pilgrim, Combinations of Complex Dynamical Systems, Springer-Verlag, Berlin, 2003; .

External links
 arXiv.org - Iterated Monodromy Group  - preprints about the Iterated Monodromy Group.
 Laurent Bartholdi's page  - Movies illustrating the Dehn twists about a Julia set.
 mathworld.wolfram.com  - The Monodromy Group page.

Geometric group theory
Homotopy theory
Complex analysis